This is a list of episodes of the South Korean variety-music show King of Mask Singer in 2021. The show airs on MBC as part of their Sunday Night lineup. Due to the COVID-19 pandemic, the show would be recorded without any audience in the episodes, and the matches' results would be decided by the celebrity panelists. The names listed below are in performance order.

 – Contestant is instantly eliminated by the live audience and judging panel
 – After being eliminated, contestant performs a prepared song for the next round and takes off their mask during the instrumental break
 – After being eliminated and revealing their identity, contestant has another special performance.
 – Contestant advances to the next round.
 – Contestant becomes the challenger.
 – Mask King.

Episodes

144th Generation Mask King (cont.)

Contestants: Elly (Weki Meki), Jeong Minseong (La Poem), Chan (Victon), Outsider, Nam Hyun-hee, Shin Hyun-woo, 

Episode 288 was broadcast on January 3, 2021.

145th Generation Mask King

Contestants: Yoo Seung-beom, Jae-gyun Hwang, ₩uNo, Yubin, Lee Young-hyun (Big Mama), Suyun (Rocket Punch)

Episode 289

Episode 289 was broadcast on January 10, 2021. This marks the beginning of the Hundred-forty-fifth Generation.

Episode 290

Episode 290 was broadcast on January 17, 2021.

146th Generation Mask King

Contestants: Park Si-hwan, Go Young-yeol (Second Moon/RabidAnce), Jaejae, Son Ah-seop, Yves (Loona), Kim Ki-bum

Episode 291

Episode 291 was broadcast on January 24, 2021. This marks the beginning of the Hundred-forty-sixth Generation.

Episode 292

Episode 292 was broadcast on January 31, 2021.

147th Generation Mask King

Contestants: Han Hee-jun, Kim Na-young, Lee Eun-gyeol, Kim Shin-eui (Monni), Ahn Sung-joon, Lee Joo-hyuk, Punch

Episode 293

Episode 293 was broadcast on February 7, 2021. This marks the beginning of the Hundred-forty-seventh Generation.

Episode 294

Episode 294 was broadcast on February 14, 2021.

148th Generation Mask King

Contestants: , Jiseon (Loveholics), Taeil (Block B), Shinsadong Tiger, Minnie ((G)I-dle), Nadeul, New (The Boyz), 

Episode 295

Episode 295 was broadcast on February 21, 2021. This marks the beginning of the Hundred-forty-eighth Generation.

Episode 296

Episode 296 was broadcast on February 28, 2021.

149th Generation Mask King

Contestants: Kim Chae-won (Iz*One), Kwon Jin-ah, Kim Boa, Park Sang-min, Choi Jung-yoon, Kim Jun-ho

Episode 297

Episode 297 was broadcast on March 7, 2021. This marks the beginning of the Hundred-forty-ninth Generation.

Episode 298

Episode 298 was broadcast on March 14, 2021.

150th Generation Mask King

Contestants: , Do Sang-woo, DJ Tukutz (Epik High), Hong Young-joo, Kim Hyun-jung

Episode 299

Episode 299 was broadcast on March 21, 2021. This marks the beginning of the Hundred-fiftieth Generation.

Episode 300

Episode 300 was broadcast on March 28, 2021.

151st Generation Mask King

Contestants: , Juvie Train, Go Yoo-jin (Flower), Lee Seung-yeon

Episode 301

Episode 301 was broadcast on April 4, 2021. This marks the beginning of the Hundred-fifty-first Generation.

Episode 302

Episode 302 was broadcast on April 11, 2021.

152nd Generation Mask King

Contestants: , Song Bong-joo, Park Sung-joon (A.R.T), Lee Joo-woo

Episode 303

Episode 303 was broadcast on April 18, 2021. This marks the beginning of the Hundred-fifty-second Generation.

Episode 304

Episode 304 was broadcast on April 25, 2021.

153rd Generation Mask King

Contestants: Kang Seung-hee (Wink), Kang Joo-hee (Wink), Gil Byung-min, Ryu Seung-min, Rocky (Astro), Yoon Hyun-sook, Sohee (Elris)

Episode 305

Episode 305 was broadcast on May 2, 2021. This marks the beginning of the Hundred-fifty-third Generation.

Episode 306

Episode 306 was broadcast on May 9, 2021.

154th Generation Mask King

Episode 307

Episode 307 was broadcast on May 16, 2021. This marks the beginning of the Hundred-fifty-fourth Generation.

Episode 308

Episode 308 was broadcast on May 23, 2021.

155th Generation Mask King

Contestants: , Kim Sang-hyuk (Click-B), Kim Dong-han (WEi), Jang Yoon-jeong

Episode 309

Episode 309 was broadcast on May 30, 2021. This marks the beginning of the Hundred-fifty-fifth Generation.

Episode 310

Episode 310 was broadcast on June 6, 2021.

156th Generation Mask King

Contestants: Sole, Monday (Weeekly), Nancy Lang, Park Min-hye (Big Mama), Choi Byung-chul

Episode 311

Episode 311 was broadcast on June 13, 2021. This marks the beginning of the Hundred-fifty-sixth Generation.

Episode 312

Episode 312 was broadcast on June 20, 2021.

157th Generation Mask King

Contestants: Choi Ye-na, Lee Ji-hoon, Lee Hoon, Choi Jung-in, 

Episode 313

Episode 313 was broadcast on June 27, 2021. This marks the beginning of the Hundred-fifty-seventh Generation.

Episode 314

Episode 314 was broadcast on July 4, 2021.

158th Generation Mask King

Contestants: Jeong Se-woon, pH-1, Hyebin (Momoland)

Episode 315

Episode 315 was broadcast on July 11, 2021. This marks the beginning of the Hundred-fifty-eighth Generation.

Episode 316

Episode 316 was broadcast on July 18, 2021.

159th Generation Mask King

Episode 317

Episode 317 was broadcast on August 8, 2021. This marks the beginning of the Hundred-fifty-ninth Generation.

Episode 318

Episode 318 was broadcast on August 15, 2021.

160th Generation Mask King

Contestants: Seungmin (Golden Child), Jay B (Got7), Sungmin (Super Junior), Im Sung-eun (Young Turks Club), Christina Confalonieri, Park Joon-geum

Episode 319

Episode 319 was broadcast on August 22, 2021. This marks the beginning of the Hundred-sixtieth Generation.

Episode 320

Episode 320 was broadcast on August 29, 2021.

161st Generation Mask King

Contestants: Lim Kim, Seo In-young,  (Nine Muses), Kim Ji-hyun (Roo'ra), Wang Ji-hye, Lee Dae-hyung, Park Wan-kyu

Episode 321

Episode 321 was broadcast on September 5, 2021. This marks the beginning of the Hundred-sixty-first Generation.

Episode 322

Episode 322 was broadcast on September 12, 2021.

Chuseok Special: Duet Mask Kings

Contestants: Kim Min-seok (MeloMance) & , Kihyun (Monsta X) & Jeong Se-woon,  & Hong Ji-hyun, Lee Min (As One) & Lisa, Kim Tae-gyun & Kim Tae-gyun (Cultwo),  & ,  & , Lee Ji-young (Big Mama) & Lee Seung-woo

Episode 323

Episode 323 was broadcast on September 19, 2021. Winner of this special episodes ("Sibling Rebellion") revealed their identities through a special performance on the beginning of episode 327.

Episode 324

Episode 324 was broadcast on September 26, 2021.

Episode 325

Episode 325 was broadcast on October 3, 2021.

162nd Generation Mask King

Episode 325

Episode 325 was broadcast on October 3, 2021. This marks the beginning of the Hundred-sixty-second Generation.

Episode 326

Episode 326 was broadcast on October 10, 2021.

163rd Generation Mask King

Contestants: N/A, Kim Joo-taek, Cho Gu-ham, Oh Sang-uk, Kim Young-ok, Carlos Galvan (Uptown)

6

Episode 327

Episode 327 was broadcast on October 17, 2021. This marks the beginning of the Hundred-sixty-third Generation.

Episode 328

Episode 328 was broadcast on October 24, 2021.

164th Generation Mask King

Contestants: Yukika,  (5tion), Kim Sang-woo, Kim Jae-hwan

Episode 329

Episode 329 was broadcast on October 31, 2021. This marks the beginning of the Hundred-sixty-fourth Generation.

Episode 330

Episode 330 was broadcast on November 7, 2021.

165th Generation Mask King

Contestants:  (Fiestar), Kim Tae-sul, John Noh (RabidAnce), Kim Heung-soo, Chunja

Episode 331

Episode 331 was broadcast on November 14, 2021. This marks the beginning of the Hundred-sixty-fifth Generation.

Episode 332

Episode 332 was broadcast on November 21, 2021.

166th Generation Mask King

Episode 333

Episode 333 was broadcast on November 28, 2021. This marks the beginning of the Hundred-sixty-sixth Generation.

Episode 334

Episode 334 was broadcast on December 5, 2021.

167th Generation Mask King

Episode 335

Episode 335 was broadcast on December 12, 2021. This marks the beginning of the Hundred-sixty-seventh Generation.

Episode 336

Episode 336 was broadcast on December 19, 2021.

168th Generation Mask King

Episode 337 was broadcast on December 26, 2021. This marks the beginning of the Hundred-sixty-eighth Generation.

References 

Lists of King of Mask Singer episodes
Lists of variety television series episodes
Lists of South Korean television series episodes
2021 in South Korean television